Aeroflot Flight 1912 ( Reys 1912 Aeroflota) was a scheduled domestic Aeroflot passenger flight on the Odessa-Kyiv-Chelyabinsk-Novosibirsk-Irkutsk-Khabarovsk-Vladivostok route that crashed on 25 July 1971, making a hard landing at Irkutsk Airport. It touched down  short of the runway, breaking the left wing and catching fire.  Of the 126 people on board the aircraft, 29 survived.

Aircraft 
The aircraft involved in the accident was a Tupolev Tu-104B, registered СССР-42405 to the West Siberia Civil Aviation Directorate, a division of Aeroflot.  At the time of the accident, the aircraft operated 19,489 flight hours and sustained 9,929 pressurization cycles.

Crew 
The crew of the fatal flight took over in Novosibirsk. A total of eight crew members were aboard the flight, of which five were from the cockpit crew.

The cockpit crew consisted of:
 A. V. Ovchinnikov serving as pilot in command
 A. A. Pinchuk serving as co-pilot
 G.P. Guslyakov serving as flight engineer
 I. V. Shchepkin serving as navigator
 V. I. Bolotin serving as radio operator
Flight attendants G. K. Eselevich, L. B. Shokina and A. N. Sorokin served as the cabin crew.

Synopsis 
The Odessa-Kyiv-Chelyabinsk-Novosibirsk part of the route was carried out by a different aircraft, Tu-104B registered СССР-42402; as well as a different crew. At the stopover in Novosibirsk at Tolmachevo Airport, a new crew and aircraft took on the route. At 04:34 local time (01:34 Moscow time) the airliner departed Novosibirsk for Irkutsk.

The crew was instructed to proceed on the final approach on a bearing of 116°. At 08:10 local time (03:10 Moscow time) the air traffic controller gave flight 1912 permission to begin descent. The flight crew responded that they heard the information and would begin approach with the ILS. In response, the air traffic controller reported weather conditions to the flight. At 08:31:52 the flight was on approach  from the runway. At 08:33:45 local time, when the flight was just  from the runway, the air traffic controller warned that they were close to missing the glide slope. In response, the flight crew notified the controller that the landing gear had been released and they were ready to land.

At 08:33:58 received permission to land; the crew confirmed they received the information. At 08:34:18 the crew reported they were near the non-directional beacon. The controller again warned the flight of the slight deviation to the left.

Due to flying  less than the recommended speed, the aircraft reached a critical angle of attack. Shortly thereafter the left wing of the plane broke, fuel leaking from the broken left tanks ignited. The plane skidded on the runway, causing the fuselage to break into pieces.

Causes 
The flight was on an approach speed far below the recommended parameters. The instruments most likely gave inaccurate readings, causing the crew to reduce speed before touching the runway led to a hard landing. While simulating the flight to determine the cause of the erroneous indications, the depressurization happened approximately three minutes after turning off the cabin pressurization. The probability of such events occurring during descent was supposed to be 0.000001%.

The investigation cited the three primary causes of the accident as follows:

See also

Aeroflot Flight 964, also a Tupolev Tu-104, crashed on approach experiencing similar artificial horizon failure.
Aeroflot Flight 2415, instrument failure of Tu-104 causing crash shortly after takeoff.
Aeroflot Flight 3932, another Tupolev Tu-104, crashed shortly after takeoff experiencing similar artificial horizon failure.

References

Aviation accidents and incidents in 1971
Aviation accidents and incidents in the Soviet Union
1912
1971 in the Soviet Union
Accidents and incidents involving the Tupolev Tu-104
Airliner accidents and incidents caused by instrument failure
Irkutsk